Springdale Farm, also known as Elwood Mendenhall Farm, is a historic home located in Pennsbury Township, Chester County, Pennsylvania. The original house was built before 1748, and now forms a wing of the main house.  The main house was built in 1836, and is a -story, five bay, stone Federal-style dwelling.  It has a steep gable roof and a long porch added in the 1870s. The property has been continuously owned by the Mendenhall family since 1703.

It was added to the National Register of Historic Places in 1973.

References

Houses on the National Register of Historic Places in Pennsylvania
Federal architecture in Pennsylvania
Houses completed in 1836
Houses in Chester County, Pennsylvania
National Register of Historic Places in Chester County, Pennsylvania